Laurențiu Constantin Ardelean (born 8 February 2001) is a Romanian international footballer who plays as a midfielder.

Club career
Ardelean joined FCSB in 2010. On 25 October 2017, at the age of 16, Ardelean made his debut for the club in a 6–1 away win against Sănătatea Cluj in the Cupa României. On 11 August 2019, Ardelean made his Liga I debut for FCSB in a 3–1 loss against Voluntari.

International career
Ardelean has represented Romania at under-16 and under-17 level.

Career statistics

Club
Statistics accurate as of match played 3 December 2022.

|}

References

2001 births
Living people
Footballers from Bucharest
Romanian footballers
Romania youth international footballers
Association football midfielders
Liga I players
FC Steaua București players
Liga II players
FC Unirea Constanța players
Liga III players
FC Steaua II București players